Lili Beaudoin is a Canadian actress. She won a Betty Mitchell award for Outstanding Performance by an Actress in a Drama in 2017.

She voices Crick from Beat Bugs, Plaid Stripes and Kettle Corn from My Little Pony: Friendship Is Magic, Rayne Martinez/Tempestra from Max Steel, and Edie Von Keet from the 2018 Littlest Pet Shop series, Littlest Pet Shop: A World of Our Own.

Beaudoin has voiced Melsa in Dragalia Lost from the character's first appearance in October/November 2018 up to the character's special second anniversary voiced message in September 2020. However, an alternate version of Melsa released as a Halloween variant in October 2020 is voiced by Anne Solange. 

Beaudoin is also the voice of Kiwi Lollipop in the 2019 My Little Pony: Equestria Girls special "Sunset's Backstage Pass".

Most recently, she is the voice of Lana in the new English dub of Hayao Miyazaki's Future Boy Conan.

References

Living people
Canadian stage actresses
Canadian voice actresses
Year of birth missing (living people)